George Horman (1 October 1883 – 22 November 1952) was an Australian rules footballer who played a single game with Geelong in the Victorian Football League (VFL) in 1904.

Family
The son of William Robert Horman (1850-1921), and Hannah Horman (1847-1921), née Cameron, George Horman was born in Geelong on 1 October 1883.

His older brother, James Horman (1877—1960), also played for both Chiwell and Geelong.

Notes

External links 

1883 births
1952 deaths
Australian rules footballers from Victoria (Australia)
Geelong Football Club players
Chilwell Football Club players